Revital Amoyal (born 10 October 1977) is an Israeli former football striker.

Club career
Born in Ashdod, Amoyal joined Ligat Nashim club Hapoel Tel Aviv upon its formation, and stayed with the club until retiring at the age of 25, in 2003. With Hapoel Tel Aviv, Amoyal won a domestic double in 2001–02, winning both the League and Cup. As the club qualified to the 2001–02 UEFA Women's Cup, Amoyal played in all three group stage matches with the club.

Amoyal made her debut with the National team on 2 September 2001, playing against Austria. Amoyal played five matches with the national team, the last on 6 June 2002, in a 2003 FIFA Women's World Cup qualification match against Croatia.

Honours
Championships (1):
2000–01
Cup (1):
2000–01

References

External links
 

1977 births
Living people
Israeli women's footballers
Israel women's international footballers
Hapoel Tel Aviv F.C. (women) players
Women's association football forwards
Israeli Jews
Jewish sportspeople
Footballers from Ashdod